Bappy Chowdhury is a Bangladeshi film actor. He made his debut in 2012, appearing in Bhalobasar Rong as an actor opposite Mahiya Mahi

Career 
Bappy has made his acting debut in 2013 with Bhalobasar Rong. He released two films "Lover Number One" and Ajob Prem which were remakes of Indian movies. In 2016 he started in Ami Tomar Hote Chai with Bidya Sinha Mim. The same year he also starred in Apon Manush with Pori Moni and One Way with Bobby.

Filmography

Awards and nominations

References

Living people
Bengali Hindus
Bangladeshi Hindus
21st-century Bangladeshi male actors
Year of birth missing (living people)